Hakan Karsak (born 1 April 1975) is a Turkish stage, television and film actor.

Karsak joined the Ankara Youth Theatre and Yahya Kemal Beyatlı High School Theatre Group in 1992 and started his career as an amateur stage actor. Shortly after, he started to work as a trainee in the Ankara Art Theatre Acting Workshop.

After high school, he enrolled in the Afyon Kocatepe University Construction Department. After graduation, he entered the Philosophy Department of Istanbul University and eventually graduated from there. After the 1999 Düzce earthquake, he worked as a theatre instructor in Düzce for 2 years, working with UNICEF in order to help children and young people affected by the disaster. Hakan Karsak was awarded the "Best Actor Award" at the Bosphorus International Film Festival in 2013. He is best known for his role in the TV series Eşkıya Dünyaya Hükümdar Olmaz, which has been on air since 2015.

Theatre
Polisler : Mrozek - Duru Theatre - 2020
Lysistrata : Diyarbakır City Theatre 
Toros Canavarı : İzmit Yeni Meydan Theatre
Sihirli Ülke : Ankara Contemporary Art Theatre
Yaşar Ne Yaşar Ne Yaşamaz : Diyarbakır City Theatre - Theatre De Un Der Ruhr
Özgürlüğün Bedeli : Diyarbakır City Theatre
Dullar : Diyarbakır City Theatre

Filmography

References

External links
 
 

Living people
Turkish male television actors
1975 births
Turkish male film actors